Łęczyca station is a railway station located in the Polish town of Łęczyca, Łódź Voivodeship. It serves mainly regional and commuter traffic between Łódź and Kutno, as well as intercity services between Gdynia and Katowice.

It opened in 1925 as a part of Łódź–Kutno railway. The main building resembles , used among other local railway stations built around early 1920's. The station serves the branch line leading to the military base near Leżnica Wielka.

Train services
The station is served by the following services:

 Intercity services (IC) Łódź Fabryczna — Bydgoszcz — Gdynia Główna
Intercity services (IC) Gdynia - Gdańsk - Bydgoszcz - Toruń - Kutno - Łódź - Częstochowa - Katowice - Bielsko-Biała
 Intercity services (TLK) Gdynia Główna — Bydgoszcz/Grudziądz — Łódź — Katowice

References 

Railway stations in Poland opened in 1925
Railway stations in Łódź Voivodeship
Railway stations served by Łódzka Kolej Aglomeracyjna